Alisher Navoi is a 1947 Soviet drama film directed by Kamil Yarmatov about the life of the famous poet and statesman Alisher Navoi.

Cast
 Razzoq Hamroyev as Alisher Navoi
 Asad Ismatov as Sultan Sultan Husayn Mirza Bayqara
 Abid Dshalilov as Majdeddin  
 Tamara Nazarova as Guli
 Saat Talipov as Yadygar 
 Rakhim Pirmukhamedov as Abul-Malik
 Lutfulla Nazrullaev as Jelaleddin

References

External links 
 

1947 films
1940s Russian-language films
Soviet black-and-white films
Soviet biographical drama films
1940s biographical drama films
Biographical films about philosophers
Biographical films about poets
Soviet-era Uzbek films
Uzbekfilm films
1947 drama films